Pseudotropheus benetos is a species of cichlid endemic to Lake Malawi known only at Likoma Island as well as along the northwestern coast between Nkhata bay and Chilumba.

References

benetos
Fish described in 1997
Taxonomy articles created by Polbot